Agency Township is a township in Osage County, Kansas, United States.

References

Townships in Osage County, Kansas
Townships in Kansas